James McGowan (born 29 January 1997) is a Scottish professional footballer, who plays as a goalkeeper for West of Scotland Premier Division side Largs Thistle.

He previously played for Greenock Morton and Dumbarton and spent loan spells at Junior clubs Cumbernauld United and Troon.

Career
McGowan started his career as a youth player at St Mirren before moving to local rivals Greenock Morton as part of their development squad. He made his debut as a substitute in November 2014, after Derek Gaston was injured against Stenhousemuir. He made his first start in the Scottish Cup in a defeat to Spartans, before making his first league start in February 2016 after Gaston suffered a concussion in the previous match.

McGowan agreed a new one-year deal for the 2016–17 season. He spent time on loan at Cumbernauld United, either side of the summer in 2016.

In May 2017, he again signed up for a further year at Morton. He was then loaned to Troon in August 2017.

Although his contract expired at the end of the 2017-18 season, new manager Ray McKinnon invited him in for pre-season training to assess him however he declined the offer to sign for Scottish League One side Dumbarton. After making just five appearances for the club, he was released in January 2019 and signed for SJFA West Region Premiership side Largs Thistle.

Personal life
As well as playing semi-professionally for Largs Thistle, McGowan also runs his own one-to-one goalkeeping school in Paisley that he launched in 2019.

Honours
Morton
SPFL Development League West: Winners (2) 2015–16, 2017–18

See also
Greenock Morton F.C. season 2015–16

References

External links

1997 births
Living people
Footballers from Paisley, Renfrewshire
Association football goalkeepers
Scottish footballers
West of Scotland Football League players
St Mirren F.C. players
Greenock Morton F.C. players
Scottish Professional Football League players
Cumbernauld United F.C. players
Troon F.C. players
Scottish Junior Football Association players
Dumbarton F.C. players
Largs Thistle F.C. players